is the first currency that was issued by the Imperial Japanese government during the early Meiji era. These notes are in denominations of yen, which are broken down into subsidiarity units known as "sen". Meiji Tsūhō notes were not redeemable for gold or silver as they were released as fiat currency.

History
These notes were the first Japanese currency ever to be printed using western printing at Dondorf and Naumann, which was located in Frankfurt. Meiji Tsuho notes were designed by Edoardo Chiossone sometime in 1870 while he was working for Dondorf Naumann on behalf of The National Bank in the Kingdom of Italy. The process of making Chiossone's proposed design a reality started with the establishment of the "Imperial Printing Bureau of Japan" in 1871 (4th year of Meiji). In order to produce the currency the Japanese government reached out to Dondorf and Naumann to gain access to Western technology. Chiossone had a falling out with Italian Bank as his relationship with them had hit a breaking point. When the company suggested Chiossone for the role as engraver, he quickly accepted the offer. The production of money was handed over to the Imperial Printing Bureau in January 1872 when banknotes began to arrive from Germany. All of these arrivals were purposely left incomplete due to security reasons, as the words "Meiji Tsuho" and the mark of the Minister of Finance were added in Japan by the Imperial Printing Bureau. Dondorf and Naumann eventually sold their printing equipment to the Japanese government towards the end of 1873 (6th year of Meiji) due to financial issues. The original drawings of Meiji Tsuho were given to Japan in the following year, and engineers were hired for technical guidance. Production of Meiji Tsuho notes were this shifted to domestic production for the rest of their issuance. These notes feature an elaborate design that was difficult to forge at the time as counterfeiting was previously rampant with clan notes.

The elaborate design worked against counterfeiters for an unknown period of time before they found a way around it. Unstamped notes sent to Japan from Germany were legally obtained by these thieves. Normally Japanese officials would add stamps to the notes finalizing the process, where in this case the counterfeiters added their own stamps. Another major issue was the Satsuma Rebellion in February 1877, which helped lead to massive inflation due to the amount of inconvertible notes issued for payment. The Japanese government responded by halting the issuance of government notes in 1879 as a hopeful remedy to the situation. During this time legal tender Meiji Tsuho notes of all denominations had issues with paper quality, and were circulating with counterfeits. These problems led the Japanese government to issue redesigned banknotes in 1882 to replace the old Meiji Tsuho notes. Additional measures were subsequently put into place which included the establishment of a centralized bank known as the Bank of Japan. All of the remaining Meiji Tsuho notes in circulation that weren't already redeemed were to be retired in favor of either gold coinage or newly printed Bank of Japan notes. This period of exchange lapsed when Meiji Tsuho notes were abolished on December 9, 1899.

Series overview

Notes printed

See also
Japanese military currency (1894–1918)
Korean yen 
Taiwanese yen

Notes

References